Cercocarpus ledifolius var. intricatus (little-leaf mountain mahogany, narrowleaf mahogany, dwarf mountain mahogany)
is a variety of Cercocarpus ledifolius that is commonly known as little-leaf mountain mahogany.

Distribution
Cercocarpus ledifolius var. intricatus is native to the Southwestern United States, from California to Colorado, where it grows in mostly dry habitat such as deserts. It can be found in rocky places and slopes of mountain brush, pinyon juniper woodland, and ponderosa pine forest vegetation types.

Description
Cercocarpus ledifolius var. intricatus is a thickly branched shrub spreading and growing erect to heights between one and three meters. The many short gray twigs on the branches bear tiny, widely spaced evergreen leaves. Each thick, short leaf is a centimeter long or less, rolled under at the edges, and leathery in texture. The inflorescence has two or three flowers. Each flower is a tiny cup merely a few millimeters wide containing several protruding stamens and one pistil. The style remains after the rest of the flower falls away. It is feathery and up to two centimeters long, with the fruit, an achene, at the tip.

References

External links

Jepson Manual Treatment - Cercocarpus intricatus
USDA Plants Profile; Cercocarpus intricatus
Cercocarpus intricatus - Photo gallery

ledifolius var. intricatus
Plants described in 1880
Flora of the California desert regions
Flora of the Western United States
Flora of Nevada
Flora of Utah
Flora of Colorado
Flora of Arizona
Flora of New Mexico
North American desert flora
Flora without expected TNC conservation status